Giuliano Tosin (born April 14, 1976), better known by his stage name Juli Manzi, is a Brazilian musician and biographer.

Biography
Juli Manzi was born in Porto Alegre on April 14, 1976. He has a brother, Giancarlo, a physicist at the Laboratório Nacional de Luz Síncrotron. He graduated in Journalism from the Federal University of Rio Grande do Sul. During his youth, he played for rock bands Los Bassetas and Colono Escocês and wrote poems for his college newspapers. It wasn't until 1999 when he released his solo debut album, 340 Exigências de Camarim, which was a critical and commercial success and awarded him a nomination to the Prêmio Açorianos. His second album, Todo o Perfex, came out in 2002.

After a 8-year hiatus from music, Manzi moved to São Paulo in 2010, where he formed the group Coletivo Absoluto alongside Rodrigo Caldas, his former Colono Escocês bandmate Oliveira de Araújo and Marcelo Pianinho of Mundo Livre S/A. Their first and so far only self-titled album came out the same year.

In 2012 he released his third solo album, Ponto Cego, which counted with guest appearances by Frank Jorge and Maurício Pereira. In 2015 Manzi returned to Porto Alegre for the first time in two years to promote his then-upcoming fourth album, O Plano Transcendental. His fifth and most recent album, Sambas, Pagodes e Uá-Uás, came out in 2018.

He also co-wrote the semi-fictional autobiography of his life-long friend Flávio Basso (better known as Jupiter Apple), A Odisseia: Memórias e Devaneios de Jupiter Apple, which was published the year following Basso's death, in 2016.

Discography

Solo

With Coletivo Absoluto

Bibliography
 A Odisseia: Memórias e Devaneios de Jupiter Apple (Azougue Editorial, 2016; co-written with Flávio Basso)

References

External links
 
 

1976 births
Living people
Brazilian rock singers
Brazilian rock musicians
Musicians from Rio Grande do Sul
People from Porto Alegre
Brazilian male guitarists
Psychedelic rock musicians
Brazilian biographers
Federal University of Rio Grande do Sul alumni
Musicians from São Paulo
Writers from São Paulo
20th-century Brazilian male singers
20th-century Brazilian singers
21st-century Brazilian male singers
21st-century Brazilian singers
Brazilian male singer-songwriters
Male biographers